I Am the Night is a six-episode American limited television series created and written by Sam Sheridan, starring Chris Pine and India Eisley. The series premiered on TNT on January 28, 2019, with a sneak peek of the first episode airing on January 27, 2019.

The series is inspired by the memoir One Day She'll Darken: The Mysterious Beginnings of Fauna Hodel, written by Fauna Hodel, documenting her unusual beginnings and the connection to her grandfather, George Hodel, a prime suspect in the infamous Black Dahlia murder mystery. A companion true-crime podcast, Root of Evil: The True Story of the Hodel Family and the Black Dahlia was released in February 2019.

Plot 
Fauna Hodel, a young girl given up by her birth mother, sets out to uncover the secrets of her past and ends up following a sinister trail that swirls closer to a gynecologist involved in the legendary Black Dahlia slaying.

Cast 

 Chris Pine as Jay Singletary, a disgraced LA-based journalist and Korean War veteran who encounters Fauna Hodel as he investigates her grandfather, George Hodel.
 India Eisley as Fauna Hodel, who has grown up believing she's biracial but she begins investigating the truth about her biological mother and father. 
 Jefferson Mays as George Hodel, Fauna's grandfather, a prominent, powerful, and dangerous LA-based physician who was a suspect in the Black Dahlia murder.
 Connie Nielsen as Corinna Hodel, George Hodel's now divorced second wife.
 Leland Orser as Peter Sullivan, Jay Singletary's editor and mentor. 
 Yul Vazquez as Billis, a LAPD sergeant detective known for his brutal tactics.
 Jay Paulson as Ohls, an LAPD detective and a Korean War vet who owes his life to Jay.
 Golden Brooks as Jimmie Lee Greenwade, Fauna's adoptive mother who has kept Fauna's origins secret from her.
 Theo Marshall as Detective Cuddy.
 Jamie Anne Allman as Tamar Hodel, George Hodel's daughter and Fauna's birth mother.
 Monique Green as Nina, Fauna's cousin.
 Shoniqua Shandai as Tina, Fauna's cousin who warns her about investigating her white family. 
 Justin Cornwell as Terrence Shye, a friend of the Lee family who takes a romantic interest in Fauna. 
 Dylan Smith as Sepp, George Hodel's right-hand man.

Episodes

Production

Development 

On July 27, 2017, the US cable network TNT announced Chris Pine would play the role of Jay Singletary in a six-episode television drama, One Day She'll Darken, and serve as an executive producer alongside director Patty Jenkins and writer Sam Sheridan. The drama was inspired by the autobiography of Fauna Hodel titled One Day She'll Darken: The Mysterious Beginnings of Fauna Hodel. In late 2017, it was reported that Carl Franklin would direct two episodes and also serve as executive producer. Victoria Mahoney will also direct two episodes. Director of photography Matthew Jensen joined the project in November 2017. The series was renamed I Am the Night and while originally announced to premiere on January 28, 2019, a sneak peek full airing of the pilot would be scheduled to follow 25th Screen Actors Guild Awards on the night before.

Casting 

On October 13, 2017, TNT announced that India Eisley, Jefferson Mays, Yul Vazquez, Justin Cornwell, Dylan Smith, Theo Marshall, Jay Paulson, and Golden Brooks had joined the cast. Leland Orser, Connie Nielsen, Shoniqua Shandai, and Monique Green were also later cast.

Marketing 
TNT released the first trailer of the show on July 2, 2018.

The premiere was screened at the American Film Institute's AFI Fest on November 9, 2018, at the Egyptian Theatre in Los Angeles, California.

Reception 
On review aggregator Rotten Tomatoes, the series holds an approval rating of 73% based on 70 reviews, with an average rating of 6.34/10. The website's critical consensus reads, "Chris Pine inhabits I Am the Night with the roguish gravitas befitting a noir — even if this entry into the pulp genre is more straightforward and languidly paced than some viewers would like." On Metacritic, it has a weighted average score of 59 out of 100, based on 26 critics, indicating "mixed or average reviews".

Accolades

Notes

See also
Root of Evil: The True Story of the Hodel Family and the Black Dahlia

References

External links 
 
 

2010s American drama television miniseries
2019 American television series debuts
2019 American television series endings
English-language television shows
TNT (American TV network) original programming
Television series about teenagers
Television shows based on books
Television series by Anonymous Content
Television series by Studio T
Television series set in the 1960s